Before The Dawn (黎明之前) is the fourth studio album by Taiwanese rock singer Shin. The album was released on 22 July 2011. It is divided into two versions: Night version and Dawn version.

Track listing

References

2011 albums
Shin (singer) albums